Julia Bailey-Serres is professor of genetics, director of the Center for Plant Cell Biology, and a member of the Institute for Integrative Genome Biology at the University of California, Riverside.  Her accomplishments include the pioneering of methods for profiling the "translatomes" of discrete cell-types of plants and identification of a homeostatic sensor of oxygen deprivation in plants.

Education
Bailey-Serres received her bachelor of science degree from the University of Utah in 1981 and earned a Ph.D. in 'Mitochondrial genome rearrangements in sorghum' from University of Edinburgh in 1986. She was a postdoctoral researcher at UC Berkeley under Michael Freeling.

Career

Research
Bailey-Serres and her researchers are investigating the molecular and physiological processes that enable plants to tolerate or survive stresses such as flooding or drought. In general, her areas of research include:
 Gene regulation 
 Translational control 
 Abiotic stress signaling/response 
 Low oxygen sensing 
 Flooding/submergence 
 Genomic technologies 

In 2003, Bailey-Serres joined a team of geneticists including Pamela Ronald of the University of California, Davis and rice breeder David Mackill in the search for the Sub1A gene that allows rice to survive complete submergence under water. The gene is not present in all rice plants, but may be introduced through breeding.

As a result of this research, scientists at the International Rice Research Institute (IRRI) created the flood-tolerant rice variety Swarna-Sub1. More than 10 million farmers are growing the rice in their flood-prone fields.

Other activities
From 2005 to 2011, Bailey-Serres was the director of the National Science Foundation's Integrative Graduate Education and Research Trainee Program (IGERT). The program trained 23 Ph.D. students versed in cell biology, chemistry, computational sciences and engineering, in advanced chemical genomics.

She is a member of the Editorial Board for PNAS.

Awards and honors
 2016 National Academy of Sciences Member
 2011 Elected Secretary of the American Society of Plant Biologists (2012)
 2010 Fellow of American Society of Plant Biologists
 2009 World Technology Award Finalist (Environment - Individual)
 2008 USDA National Research Initiative Discovery Award
 2008 F.C. Donders Chair, Utrecht University, The Netherlands
 2005 American Association for the Advancement of Science Fellow (AAAS)
 2002 Outstanding Faculty Mentor, Chancellor's Award for Excellence in Undergraduate Research

References

Year of birth missing (living people)
Living people
American women geneticists
American geneticists
University of Utah alumni
Alumni of the University of Edinburgh
University of California, Riverside faculty
Academic staff of Utrecht University
Place of birth missing (living people)
Members of the United States National Academy of Sciences
21st-century American biologists
21st-century American women scientists
Scientists from Utah